Adilabad - Hazur Sahib Nanded Express is an intercity train of the Indian Railways connecting Adilabad in Telangana and Nanded of Maharashtra. It is currently being operated with 17409/17410 train numbers on a daily basis. It was flagged off on 14 July 2012.

Service
The 17409 Adilabad - Hazur Sahib Nanded Express has an average speed of 47 km/hr and covers 184 km in 3 hours 55 minutes. The 17410 Hazur Sahib Nanded - Adilabad Express has an average speed of 48 km/hr and covers 184 km in 3 hours 50 minutes.

Route and halts

Timings 
The 17409 Adilabad-Hazur Sahib Nanded Express departs from Adilabad at 8:00 a.m. and arrives at Hazur Sahib Nanded at 11:55 a.m.. 
The 17410 Hazur Sahib Nanded-Adilabad Express departs from Hazur Sahib Nanded at 3:50 p.m. and arrives at Adilabad at 6:55 p.m..

Coach composite

The train consists of 13 coaches :

 1 AC III Tier
 4 Sleeper Coaches
 3 Second Class sitting
 4 General
 2 Second-class Luggage/parcel van

Traction 
As the route is not completely electrified, the train is mostly hauled by a Gooty-based WDP-4D.

Rake Sharing  
This train shares its rake with 17405/17406 Krishna Express

References

External links 
 17409/Adilabad-Hazur Sahib Nanded Express
 17410/Hazur Sahib Nanded-Adilabad Express

Transport in Adilabad
Transport in Nanded
Express trains in India
Rail transport in Maharashtra
Rail transport in Telangana